Batizovský štít (pol. Batyżowiecki Szczyt, ger. Botzdorfer Spitze, hung. Batizfalvi csúcs) is a 2,448 metres high double peak mountain in High Tatras in Slovakia. Batizovský štít, just like Batizovská dolina, Batizovské pleso or the village Batizovce are named after the local 13th century aristocrat Batiz (Botiz) from the Mariáš dynasty, who used to be the owner of Mengusovská or Batizovská dolina and established the village of Batizovce.

Batizovský štít isn't accessible for tourists by a marked trail, but trail passes around the Batizovské pleso lake under the mountain. The solid rock makes it one of the best climbing spots in High Tatras containing dozens of routes in different grades of difficulty. You can however find an official tourist trail leading close to the peak, offering astonishing views to Gerlachovský štít, Končistá and Kačací štít.

First ascends 
Summer: Karol Jurzyca and Jozef Galko-Rusnak (1900)

Winter: Zygmunt Klemensiewics and Jezry Maslanka (1909)

References

Mountains of Slovakia
High Tatras
Mountains of the Western Carpathians
Two-thousanders of Slovakia